Robin James Boyle (27 March 1927 – 25 July 2003) was a British broadcaster and BBC radio presenter.

Early life

Born in Folkestone, Kent, Boyle's parents moved to Ireland while he was still young. He enlisted at the age of 14 into the army where he worked in Reconnaissance later becoming part of the British Forces Network. It was here that he learnt his trade as a radio presenter and at the end of World War 2 transferred to the BBC.

Career

Although best known as presenter of Friday Night is Music Night, Boyle did occasional shifts on Radio 4 in the early days including a number of overnight news reading shifts. His broadcasting career started in 1945 on BFN in Hamburg as announcer then Head of Presentation.

He also worked on several light entertainment programs such as The Navy Lark and Hancock's Half Hour. Towards the end of his career, Boyle worked alongside the RAF Benevolent Fund and Cancer Research, becoming a life governor in 1988 and subsequently a Freeman of the City of London. He ended his career having spent more than 50 years in the BBC upon his retirement in 1998. He died in Sleaford, Lincolnshire

See also
Friday Night is Music Night

References

1927 births
2003 deaths
British broadcasters
English broadcasters
English radio presenters